Celeste is a brand of frozen pizza owned by Pinnacle Foods. It is widely referred to by its informal name Mama Celeste.  The brand's slogan is Abbondanza, which means "Abundance" in Italian.

Background
The product was named after Celeste (née Luise) Lizio (1908–1988) who carried the nickname "Mama Celeste". She came to the United States from Italy with her husband Anthony in the 1920s. They settled on Chicago's West Side, where they opened their first restaurant in 1932. In 1962, the Lizios closed the restaurant and began selling pizzas to other restaurants. The Quaker Oats Company acquired the product in 1969. Celeste frozen pizza was one of the top selling brands in the 1970s (with Mrs. Lizio, "Mama Celeste," prominently featured in the brand's television advertising) but subsequently experienced declines. The Celeste brand was later acquired by Aurora Foods, and then Pinnacle Foods.

As of 2012, Pinnacle Foods marketed only frozen, microwavable "Pizza for One" varieties of Celeste pizzas. Distribution is now restricted to more regional markets.

See also
 List of frozen food brands

External links 

 New York Times obituary of Celeste Lizio
 Pinnacle Foods' Celeste page

Frozen pizza brands
Pinnacle Foods brands
1969 introductions